David F. James (December 6, 1905 – July 7, 1996) was an American farmer and politician. He acted as Lieutenant Governor of Montana, serving from 1962 to 1965. James was a Freemason.

See also
 List of lieutenant governors of Montana

External links

References

1905 births
1996 deaths
Lieutenant Governors of Montana
Montana Democrats